The 13th (Service) Battalion (Wandsworth), East Surrey Regiment was a British New Army infantry battalion during the First World War. Formed in 1915 as a hostilities-only battalion, it was part of the East Surrey Regiment garrisoned at Witley, England. Going to France in 1916, it saw action at the battles of the Somme, Cambrai, Arras and the Lys.

Formation
The battalion was formed in Wandsworth by the Mayor on 16 June 1915, and the War Office recognised the battalion on 28 August 1915. The separate 14th (Service) Battalion (Wandsworth) East Surrey Regiment was absorbed into other training reserve battalions in June 1916.

The 13th Battalion wore a special cap badge, authorised by the War Office. The arms of Wandsworth were displayed at the centre of the badge, instead of the arms of Guildford, worn more generally by the East Surrey Regiment.

Western Front

1916
After training in southern England, the battalion landed at Le Harve on 4 June 1916. They were then moved to Lens and from there with the 40th Division moved to the Hohenzollern Redoubt where they relieved the 12th Battalion, Suffolk Regiment. They were not involved in major actions at the Hohenzollern Redoubt, but artillery bombardment was starting to take a toll, with casualties of 16%. The battalion was then put into reserve for the next months while the 40th Division was being relieved. The battalion was then temporarily attached to the 49th Division to help relieve the 4th Battalion, King's Own Yorkshire Light Infantry at Hébuterne near the town of Albert, during the Battle of the Somme. They soon rejoined the 40th Division and marched to Bouchavesnes Area near the Somme Valley where they spent Christmas.

1917
During the German withdrawal to the Hindenburg Line in the spring, the 13th Battalion were in the front line near Bouchavesnes. It was here, on 24 April during the Battle of Arras, that Corporal Edward Foster of the battalion won the Victoria Cross when he entered a heavily protected enemy trench and knocked out two machine guns, enabling the advance to continue. In the autumn, the battalion were heavily engaged in the Battle of Cambrai.

1918
The battalion fought at the Battle of the Lys during the German spring offensive and suffered severe loses when surrounded at Fleurbaix. In May, the battalion was reduced to cadre strength. After a period attached to the US Army for training purposes, the battalion returned to England on 30 June. Stationed in Lowestoft, they absorbed the newly formed 15th Battalion East Surrey Regiment and were disbanded on 3 November 1918.

Post war
After the war, to recognise their service, each Service Battalion that served overseas was presented with a King’s Colour. The colour of the 13th Battalion was presented at a special ceremony on Wandsworth Common on 16 July 1921, in the presence of over 350 former members of the battalion.

References

Battalions of the British Army in World War I
East Surrey Regiment
East Surrey
East Surrey
Military units and formations in Wandsworth
Military units and formations in London
Military units and formations established in 1915
Military units and formations disestablished in 1918